Zoll may refer to:

 Zoll, abbreviation for the German Bundeszollverwaltung (Federal Customs Service)
 Zoll, German unit of length,  of a Fuß, similar to the Imperial Inch

People 

 Andrzej Zoll (born 1942), Polish lawyer, former judge and president of the Polish Constitutional Tribunal
 Carl Zoll (1899–1973), an American professional football player who was an original member of the Green Bay Packers
 Dick Zoll, player in the National Football League for the Cleveland Rams and Green Bay Packers from 1937 to 1939 as a guard and tackle
 Franz Joseph Zoll, (1772–1833), a German sculptor and painter
 Kilian Zoll (1818–1860), a Swedish artist
 Martin Zoll (1900–1967), a professional football player who was an original member of the Green Bay Packers
 Paul Zoll (1911–1999), American cardiologist who was one of the pioneers in the development of the cardiac pacemaker and defibrillator
 Samuel Zoll (born 1934), an American lawyer, judge and politician
 Sharnee Zoll (born 1986), an American point guard that plays professional basketball throughout Europe

See also 
 Zoll surface, named after Otto Zoll, a surface homeomorphic to the 2-sphere, equipped with a Riemannian metric all of whose geodesics are closed and of equal length
 Zoll., taxonomic author abbreviation of Heinrich Zollinger (1818–1859), Swiss botanist